Dichomeris rectifascia is a moth in the family Gelechiidae. It was described by Hou-Hun Li and Zhe-Min Zheng in 1997. It is found in Gansu, China.

The wingspan is about 15 mm. The forewings are yellow, mixed with dark brown, especially at the base and termen, almost forming a blotch or fascia. The costal margin is black basally and there is a black fascia at three-fifths, not reaching the costal margin, with a black spot within the cell and at fold respectively; cilia are yellow, but ochreous yellow on the tornus. The hindwings are greyish brown.

References

Moths described in 1997
rectifascia